Sebastian Sobieski (ca. 1552–1614) was a Polish szlachcic (nobleman), Court Standard-Bearer of the Crown since 1596, courtier and starost of Rosice and Bohuslav. Member of the Sejm.

Son of Jan Sobieski h. Janina and Katarzyna Gdeszyńska h. Gozdawa, brother of Voivode of Lublin Marek Sobieski.

Marriage and issue 

Sebastian married Anna Zebrzydowska z Więchocka h. Radwan, the daughter of Mikołaj Zebrzydowski h. Radwan and Urszula Korzbok Zawadzka h. Korzbok and had three children:

 Tomasz – died young and childless,
 Stefan – (died 1660) – jesuit,
 Zofia Konstancja – consort of starost of Mirachowo Zygmunt Szczepański h. Dołęga

Bibliography 
 Korzon T., Dola i niedola Jana Sobieskiego 1629–1674, t. I, Wydawnictwo Akademii Umiejętności, Kraków 1898, tabl. VIII (Wielkopolska Biblioteka Cyfrowa 307/307).
 Nagórski W., Maroszek J., Tykocin. Miasto królewskie, AZ Media, Tykocin 2004, s. 77–81.
 Podhorodecki L., Sobiescy herbu Janina, Ludowa Spółdzielnia Wydawnicza, Warszawa 1981, s. 13.

References

External links 
 http://www.wilanow-palac.pl/sobieski_sebastian_h_janina_ok_1552_1615.html

16th-century births
1614 deaths
Sebastian
16th-century Polish politicians
17th-century Polish politicians